"Compulsory Hero" is the fourth single by Australian rock-pop band 1927. The track was released on 17 April 1989 and peaked at number 14 in May on the ARIA singles chart. The song is taken from their debut album...ish which peaked at number 1 on the ARIA Charts in April 1989.

At the ARIA Music Awards of 1990, Geoff Barter won the ARIA Award for Best Video. The song was further nominated for ARIA Award for Best Group but lost to The Black Sorrows.

The song talks about a father's experience in the Vietnam War.

Track listing
 7" / CD single

Charts

Weekly chart

References

1927 (band) songs
1988 songs
1989 singles
ARIA Award-winning songs
Australian pop rock songs
Warner Music Group singles